Elections to the Borough of Colchester,  a local government district and borough in Essex, England, took place in 1990. Due to boundary changes the entire council was up for election as opposed to the normal one-third.

Results Summary

Ward Results

Berechurch

Birch Messing Copford

Boxted & Langham

Castle

Dedham

East Donyland

Fordham

Great & Little Horkesley

Great Tey

Harbour

Lexden

Marks Tey

Mile End

New Town

Prettygate

Pyefleet

Shrub End

St. Andrew's

St. Anne's

St. John's

St. Mary's

Stanway

Tiptree

West Bergholt & Eight Ash Green

Winstree

West Mersea

Wivenhoe

References

1990
1990 English local elections
1990s in Essex